Paul Collins may refer to:

Sports
 Paul Collins (end) (1907–1988), American football player
 Paul Collins (quarterback) (1922–2012), American football player
 Paul Collins (runner) (1926–1995), Canadian long-distance runner
 Paul Collins (businessman) (born 1953), New Zealand businessman and sports administrator
 Paul Collins (English footballer) (born 1966), English association football player
 Paul Collins (rugby union) (born 1959), former Irish rugby union international player
 Paul Collins (American Samoan footballer) (born 1997), American Samoan footballer

Arts and media
 Paul Collins (actor) (born 1937), English actor
 Paul Collins (artist) (born 1936), American realist painter
 Paul Collins (Australian religious writer) (born 1940), Australian historian, broadcaster and writer
 Paul Collins (fantasy writer) (born 1954), Australian writer
 Paul Collins (musician) (born 1956), American musician
 Paul Collins (American writer) (born 1969), American writer

Other
 Paul Collins (Brookside), character in Brookside from 1982 to 1990
 The Paul Collins Beat, an American power pop band